is a Japanese professional baseball player for the Yomiuri Giants.

References

Living people
1988 births
Baseball people from Ishikawa Prefecture
Japanese baseball players
Nippon Professional Baseball outfielders
Yokohama BayStars players
Yokohama DeNA BayStars players
Hokkaido Nippon-Ham Fighters players
Yomiuri Giants players